Steven Claydon (born 1969) is a sculptor and musician based in London.

Claydon was born in London. He has performed and shown work internationally in exhibitions at Tate Modern in London, Art Basel in Switzerland,  in Düsseldorf and Portikus in Frankfurt am Main.

Claydon was also a member of the now defunct electronica band Add N to (X). In 2005, Claydon had a cameo appearance in the film Harry Potter and the Goblet of Fire as a member of the band The Weird Sisters.

References

Notes

1969 births
British sculptors
British male sculptors
Living people
21st-century British male actors
British male film actors
English contemporary artists